Meghan O'Leary (born August 24, 1984 in Tulsa, Oklahoma) is an American rower.

She attended the University of Virginia, where she played volleyball and softball.

She competed at the 2016 Summer Olympics in Rio de Janeiro, in the women's double sculls.

She has qualified to represent the United States at the 2020 Summer Olympics.

References

1984 births
Living people
American female rowers
Olympic rowers of the United States
Rowers at the 2016 Summer Olympics
Rowers at the 2020 Summer Olympics
World Rowing Championships medalists for the United States
Sportspeople from Tulsa, Oklahoma
Sportspeople from Baton Rouge, Louisiana
Virginia Cavaliers women's volleyball players
Virginia Cavaliers softball players